The Diocese of Peoria (Peoria, Illinois) is a Latin Church ecclesiastical territory or diocese of the Catholic Church in the central Illinois region of the United States. The Diocese of Peoria is a suffragan diocese within the ecclesiastical province of the Archdiocese of Chicago.

Territory
The Diocese of Peoria comprises the following Illinois counties:

Bureau, Champaign, DeWitt, Fulton, Hancock, Henderson, Henry, Knox, LaSalle, Livingston, Logan, Marshall, Mason, McDonough, McLean, Mercer, Peoria, Piatt, Putnam, Rock Island, Schuyler, Stark, Tazewell, Vermilion, Warren and Woodford.

History

Early history

1670 to 1776 
During the 17th century, present day Illinois was part of the French colony of New France. The Diocese of Quebec, which had jurisdiction over the colony, sent numerous French missionaries to the region.

Catholicism in the Peoria area dates from the days of the missionary Jacques Marquette, who rested at the Native American village of Peoria on his voyage up the Illinois River in 1673. Opposite the present site of Peoria, the explorers Robert de La Salle and Henri de Tonti in 1680 built Fort Crèvecoeur.  Mass was celebrated there by the Recollect Fathers, Gabriel Ribourdi, Zenobius Membre, and Louis Hennepin. With some breaks in the succession, the line of missionaries extends to within a short period of the founding of modern Peoria. After the British took control of New France in 1763, the Archdiocese of Quebec retained jurisdiction in the Illinois area.

1776 to 1875 
In 1776, the new United States claimed sovereignty over the area of Illinois. In 1785, Archbishop John Carroll of the Archdiocese of Baltimore, then having jurisdiction over the entire United States, sent his first missionary to Illinois. In 1787, the area became part of the Northwest Territory of the United States.

With the creation of the Diocese of Bardstown in Kentucky in 1810, supervision of the Illinois missions shifted there. In 1827, the new bishop of the Diocese of St. Louis assumed jurisdiction in the new state of Illinois.  In 1834, the Vatican erected the Diocese of Vincennes, which included both Indiana and Illinois.In 1839 Father Raho, an Italian priest, visited Peoria, remaining long enough to build the old stone church in Kickapoo, Illinois.  St. Mary's, the first Catholic church in the city proper, was erected by Father John A. Drew in 1846. Among his successors was the poet, Reverend Abram J. Ryan.

Many of the early Irish immigrants came to work on the Illinois and Michigan Canal; owing to the failure of the contracting company, they received their pay in land scrip instead of cash, and were thus forced to settle upon hitherto untilled farm-land. These Irish farmers, with the Germans, were followed by Poles, Slovaks, Slovenians, Croats, Lithuanians, and Italians who came to work in the coal mines. They were first organized in parishes looked after by priests of their own nationality.

Diocese of Peoria

1875 to 1930 
Due to the rapid growth of the church in central Illinois, Coadjutor Bishop Thomas Foley of Chicago became concerned about his ability to govern that region along with Chicago. He requested a division of his diocese in 1872, but the Vatican did not act on it.  After another appeal in 1874, Pope Pius IX on February 12, 1875, erected the new Diocese of Peoria. It included 23 counties in  Illinois from the Mississippi River to the Indiana border. Peoria was chosen as the see city.

Pius IX appointed Reverend John Spalding of the Diocese of Louisville as the first bishop of Peoria in 1876.  That same year, six Sisters of the Third Order of St. Francis arrived from Iowa City, Iowa, to care for the sick. They served at the city hospital and made home visits to patients. Shortly after the nuns' arrival, Spalding visited the city hospital. Observing their difficult working conditions, he encouraged them to form a separate congregation with his support. As the mother superior had no objections, the Sisters of the Third Order of St. Francis of Peoria was established in July 1877. St. Francis Hospital opened in Peoria 1878.Suffering from paralysis in 1905, Spalding resigned as bishop in 1908.

Pope Pius X named Reverend Edmund Dunne of the Archdiocese of Chicago as the second bishop of Peoria. During the early 1920s, the future Archbishop Fulton Sheen, a popular television host in the 1950's, was a priest in the diocese.  After Sheen spent time in pastoral and teaching jobs in the United Kingdom, Dunne ordered him to return to Peoria in 1925.  Both Columbia University in New York City and Oxford University in England offered Sheen teaching positions.  However, instead of allowing Sheen to take one of these prestigious positions, Dunne assigned him as a curate to St. Patrick's, a poor parish in Peoria.  Sheen took the assignment without any complaints and enjoyed his time there.  Nine months later, Dunne summoned Sheen to his office.  Dunne told him:I promised you to Catholic University over a year ago.  They told me that with all your traipsing around Europe, you'd be so high hat you couldn't take orders.  But Father Cullen says you've been a good boy at St. Patrick's.  So run along to Washington.

1930 to 1990 
After Dunn died in 1929, Pope Pius XI replaced him in 1930 with Reverend Joseph Schlarman.  In 1951, he died after 20 years as bishop of Peoria. Auxiliary Bishop William Edward Cousins was the next bishop of the diocese, named by Pope Pius XII in 1952.  During his tenure as bishop, Cousins established five new parishes and six new grade schools. Pope John XXIII named Cousins as archbishop of the Archdiocese of Milwaukee in 1958.  To replace Cousins, Pope John XXIII appointed Bishop John Franz from the Diocese of Dodge City in 1959.  As bishop, Franz created 17 new grade schools, two new high schools, one Newman Centre, four new parishes, four missions, and elevate eight missions to parish status.  He retired in 1971 and Pope Paul VI named Reverend Edward  O'Rourke to replace Franz.

O'Rourke sold the episcopal residence on Glen Oak Avenue and moved to a one-bedroom brick ranch house near St. Mary's Cathedral, donating the money to the diocesan fund for retired priests. He established the first Diocesan Pastoral Council in 1974. That same year he established he replaced the old system of six deaneries by dividing the diocese into fifteen vicariates. He ordained the first permanent deacons of the diocese in 1976.He established the Annual Stewardship Appeal (now known as the Annual Diocesan Appeal) and the Teens Encounter Christ program. He consolidated Costa Catholic School in Galesburg, Illinois, (1972), Jordan Catholic School in Rock Island, Illinois, (1974), La Salle Catholic School (1978) and Peoria Notre Dame High School (1988).In 1987, Pope John Paul II appointed Myers as coadjutor bishop of the Diocese of Peoria to assist Bishop Edward O'Rourke.

1990 to present 
When O'Rourke retired in 1990 after 19 years as bishop, Myers automatically succeeded him.  While bishop, Myers issued an order forbidding Catholic hospitals in the diocese from providing emergency contraception to rape victims, a restriction he later eased. He also fired a teacher at a Catholic high school for inviting a speaker to discuss the ordination of women to the priesthood. During Myers' tenure, the diocese saw a rapid increase in vocations to the priesthood, with many seminarians being drawn to his more conservative theology. In 2001, John Paul II appointed Myers as archbishop of the Archdiocese of Newark. John Paul II named Auxiliary Bishop Daniel R. Jenky of the Diocese of South Bend-Fort Wayne as the new bishop of Peoria.

As bishop, Jenky led the canonization cause of Archbishop Sheen. However, in 2014, citing undocumented verbal agreements, Jenky announced that he would not permit the cause to progress until Sheen's remains were transferred to Peoria from St. Patrick's Cathedral in New York City. After three years of litigation by the Diocese of Peoria against the Archdiocese of New York regarding Sheen's wishes, his remains were moved to Peoria in June 2019.

On May 11, 2020, Pope Francis named Reverend Louis Tylka of the Archdiocese of Chicago as coadjutor bishop of the diocese.  When Jenky retired in 2022, Tylka automatically became the new and current bishop of Peoria.

Sexual abuse 
In August 2013, the Diocese of Peoria settled a sexual abuse lawsuit for $1.35 million.  The plaintiff, Andrew Ward, had accused Thomas Maloney, a diocese priest, of molesting him during the 1990's when he was eight years old.  The lawsuit claimed that Bishop Myers allowed Maloney to remain in ministry despite evidence of prior sexual abuse.  Maloney was later accused of sexual abuse by three more victims.

In February 2018, Jenky was sued along with the other Catholic bishops in Illinois.  Two of the plaintiffs claimed sexual abuse by priests in the Diocese of Peoria during the 1970's and 1980's.  Attorney for the plaintiffs accused Jenky of providing incomplete lists of priests who were considered credibly accused of sexual abuse.  The diocese denied the charges.

Bishops

Bishops of Peoria
 John Lancaster Spalding (1876–1908)
 Edmund Michael Dunne (1909–1929)
 Joseph Henry Leo Schlarman (1930–1951), appointed archbishop ad personam in 1951
 William Edward Cousins (1952–1958), appointed archbishop of Milwaukee
 John Baptist Franz (1959–1971)
 Edward William O'Rourke (1971–1990)
 John Joseph Myers (1990–2001; coadjutor 1987-1990), appointed archbishop of Newark
 Daniel Robert Jenky (2002–2022)
 Louis Tylka (2022- Present, Coadjutor 2020–2022)

Auxiliary bishops
 Peter Joseph O'Reilly (1900-1923)

Other diocesan priests who became bishops
 Gerald Thomas Bergan, appointed bishop of Des Moines and later archbishop of Omaha
 Fulton J. Sheen, appointed auxiliary bishop of New York and later bishop of Rochester, and elevated to archbishop (personal title) upon retirement in 1969

Education
The diocese has thirty-one elementary schools and seven high schools.

High schools
 Alleman High School, Rock Island
 Central Catholic High School, Bloomington
 Marquette High School, Ottawa
 Peoria Notre Dame High School, Peoria
 St. Bede Academy, Peru
 St. Thomas More High School, Champaign
 Schlarman Academy, Danville

See also

References

Sources
 catholic-hierarchy

External links
 Roman Catholic Diocese of Peoria Official Site
 Profile of Bishop Daniel R. Jenky
 Catholic Hierarchy
 

 
Peoria
Peoria, Illinois
Religious organizations established in 1875
Peoria